Painting The Corners: The Best of Fastball is a compilation album released by the rock band Fastball. It was put together democratically by the band after they had parted ways with Hollywood Records.

Track listing

References

2002 greatest hits albums
Fastball (band) albums
Hollywood Records compilation albums